Mitreola is a genus of fossil sea snails, marine gastropod mollusks in the family Volutidae, the volutes.

Species
Species within the genus Mitreola include:
 † Mitreola brohii Merle & Pacaud & Marivaux, 2014 
 † Mitreola labratula  Lamarck, 1803 (1 record from the Eocene in the United Kingdom) 
 † Mitreola monodonta (Lamarck 1803) (synonym : Mitra monodonta)
 † Mitreola salaputium T. A. Darragh 1989

Species brought into synonymy
 † Mitreola branderi (Defrance, 1824): synonym of † Eovoluta branderi (Defrance, 1824) 
 † Mitreola chaussyensis (Cossmann, 1907): synonym of † Eovoluta branderi (Defrance, 1824) 
 † Mitreola parisiensis (Deshayes, 1832): synonym of † Eovoluta branderi (Defrance, 1824)

Description
These species were epifaunal carnivores.

See also
Mitreola (plant)

References

External links
 Cernohorsky W. O. (1976). The Mitrinae of the World. Indo-Pacific Mollusca 3(17) page(s): 281

Volutidae